Nysius is a genus of false chinch bugs in the family Lygaeidae. At least 100 described species are placed in Nysius.

Like other seed bugs, some species in the genus have proven to be crop pests of wheat and other grains (including N. huttoni), as well as many vegetables. A unique Hawaiian radiation of the genus contains almost a quarter of the world's species (26), as well as the most diverse character set seen in the genus. In addition, two closely related species (colloquially known as wēkiu bugs) found on Mauna Loa and Mauna Kea on the island of Hawai'i, are different from the rest of Nysius by exhibiting reduced nonfunctional wings, and feed on dead and dying insects (N. wekiuicola, N. aa ).

Species
The genus contains the following species:

 Nysius aa Polhemus, 1998
 Nysius abnormis Usinger, 1942
 Nysius albipennis Distant, W.L., 1913
 Nysius angustatus Uhler, 1872
 Nysius angustellus (Blanchard, 1852)
 Nysius atlantidum Horváth, 1890
 Nysius baeckstroemi Bergroth, 1924
 Nysius beardsleyi Ashlock, 1966
 Nysius blackburni White, 1881
 Nysius caledoniae Distant, 1920
 Nysius cargadosensis Distant, W.L., 1909
 Nysius ceylanicus (Motschulsky, 1863)
 Nysius chenopodii Usinger, 1942
 Nysius coenosulus Stål, 1859
 Nysius communis Usinger, 1942
 Nysius contiguus Walker, 1872
 Nysius convexus (Usinger, 1942)
 Nysius cymoides (Spinola, 1837)
 Nysius dallasi White, 1878
 Nysius delectulus Perkins, 1912
 Nysius delectus White, 1878
 Nysius dohertyi Distant, W.L., 1904
 Nysius ephippiatus Spinola, 1852
 Nysius ericae (Schilling, 1829)
 Nysius erythynus Fernando, 1960
 Nysius euphorbiae Horvath, G., 1910
 Nysius eximius Stal, 1858
 Nysius expressus Distant, 1883
 Nysius femoratus Van Duzee, E.P., 1940
 Nysius feuerborni China, W.E., 1935
 Nysius frigatensis Usinger, 1942
 Nysius fucatus Usinger, 1942
 Nysius fullawayi Usinger, 1942
 Nysius fuscovittatus Barber, 1958
 Nysius gloriae Baena & García, 1999
 Nysius graminicola (Kolenati, 1845)
 Nysius grandis Baker, 1906
 Nysius groenlandicus (Zetterstedt, 1838)
 Nysius haeckeli (Leon *, 1890)
 Nysius hardyi Ashlock, 1966
 Nysius helveticus (Herrich-Schäffer, 1850)
 Nysius hidakai Nakatani, 2015
 Nysius huttoni White, F.B., 1878
 Nysius immunis (Walker, 1872)
 Nysius inconspicuus Distant, 1903
 Nysius insoletus Barber, 1947
 Nysius irroratus (Spinola, 1852)
 Nysius kinbergi Usinger, 1959
 Nysius lacustrinus Distant, 1909
 Nysius latus Wagner, 1958
 Nysius lichenicola Kirkaldy, 1910
 Nysius liliputanus Eyles & Ashlock, 1969
 Nysius longicollis Blackburn, 1888
 Nysius melanicus Distant, W.L., 1909
 Nysius minor Distant, W.L., 1909
 Nysius mixtus Usinger, 1942
 Nysius monticolus Distant, 1893
 Nysius neckerensis Usinger, 1942
 Nysius nemorivagus White, 1881
 Nysius niger Baker, 1906
 Nysius nigricornis Kerzhner, 1979
 Nysius nihoae Usinger, 1942
 Nysius nubilus Dallas, W.S., 1852
 Nysius oceanicus Usinger, R.L., 1937
 Nysius orarius Malipatil, 2005
 Nysius pacificus China, 1930
 Nysius pallipennis Walker, F., 1872
 Nysius palor Ashlock, 1963
 Nysius paludicola Barber, 1949
 Nysius paludicolus Barber, H.G., 1949
 Nysius picipes Usinger, R.L., 1937
 Nysius pilosulus Horvath, 1904
 Nysius plebejus (Distant, 1883)
 Nysius procerus Distant, 1893
 Nysius puberulus Berg, 1895
 Nysius pulchellus Stal, C., 1859
 Nysius punctipes Stal, C., 1856
 Nysius raphanus Howard, 1872
 Nysius rhyparus Stål, 1859
 Nysius rubescens White, 1881
 Nysius salti Usinger, R.L., 1952
 Nysius sanctaehelenae White, F.B., 1877
 Nysius scutellatus Dallas, 1852
 Nysius senecionis (Schilling, 1829)
 Nysius simulans Stål, 1859
 Nysius spectabilis Distant, 1901
 Nysius steeleae China, W.E., 1934
 Nysius stratus Scudder, 1890
 Nysius subcinctus Walker, F., 1872
 Nysius sublittoralis Perkins, 1912
 Nysius suffusus Usinger, 1942
 Nysius tasmaniensis Malipatil, 2005
 Nysius tenellus Barber, 1947
 Nysius terrae Scudder, 1890
 Nysius terrestris Usinger, 1942
 Nysius thymi (Wolff, 1804)
 Nysius transcaspicus Wagner, 1958
 Nysius tritus Scudder, 1890
 Nysius usitatus Ashlock, 1972
 Nysius vecula Scudder, 1890
 Nysius veculus Scudder, S.H., 1890
 Nysius vinctus Scudder, 1890
 Nysius vinitor Bergroth, 1891
 Nysius vulcanorum Lindberg, H., 1958
 Nysius wekiuicola Ashlock & Gagne, 1983

Gallery

See also
 Nysius species

References

Further reading

External links

 
 

 
Pentatomomorpha genera